The pygmy brocket (Mazama nana) is a brocket deer species from South America. It is found in southern Brazil, Argentina and Paraguay. It is a small deer with short legs, weighing . It is reddish-brown in color.

This species is sometimes considered a subspecies of Mazama rufina.

References

Emmons, L.H. (1997). Neotropical Rainforest Mammals, 2nd ed. University of Chicago Press 

Mazama (genus)
Mammals described in 1872